Elena Dementieva and Janette Husárová were the defending champions, but both players competed in this edition with different partners. Dementieva teamed up with Lina Krasnoroutskaya, while Husárová teamed up with Conchita Martínez. Both teams were eliminated by Virginia Ruano Pascual and Paola Suárez in the first round and quarterfinals, respectively.

Kim Clijsters and Ai Sugiyama won the title by defeating Lindsay Davenport and Lisa Raymond 6–4, 7–5 in the final.

Seeds

Draw

Draw

References

External links
 Official results archive (ITF)
 Official results archive (WTA)

Acura Classic - Doubles
Southern California Open